The Bamako Convention (in full: Bamako Convention on the Ban of the Import into Africa and the Control of Transboundary Movement and Management of Hazardous Wastes within Africa) is a treaty of African nations prohibiting the import of any hazardous (including radioactive) waste.  The convention was negotiated by twelve nations of the Organisation of African Unity at Bamako, Mali in January, 1991, and came into force in 1998.

Impetus for the Bamako Convention arose from the failure of the Basel Convention to prohibit trade of hazardous waste to less developed countries (LDCs), and from the realization that many developed nations were exporting toxic wastes to Africa. This impression was strengthened by several prominent cases. The barrels, found in storage in the port of Koko, contained toxic waste including polychlorinated biphenyls, and their eventual shipment back to Italy led to protests closing three Italian ports.

The Bamako Convention uses a format and language similar to that of the Basel Convention, but is much stronger in prohibiting all imports of hazardous waste. Additionally, it does not make exceptions on certain hazardous wastes (like those for radioactive materials) made by the Basel Convention.

Bamako Conference 
The first Conference of the Parties to the Bamako Convention convened from 24 to 26 June 2013 at Bamako, Mali.

During the conference, parties agreed that the United Nations Environmental Programme would carry out the Bamako Convention Secretariat functions. Parties also resolved to encourage the Secretariat of the Bamako Convention to strengthen its ties with the Secretariat of the Basel, Rotterdam and Stockholm Conventions.

The following parties to the Bamako Convention attended COP 1: Benin, Burkina Faso, Burundi, Cameroon, Congo, Democratic Republic of the Congo (DRC), Côte d'Ivoire, Ethiopia, Gambia, Libya, Mali, Mozambique, Mauritius, Niger, Senegal, Togo and Tunisia. In addition, Eswatini, Guinea, Guinea-Bissau, Liberia, Nigeria and Zambia participated as observers.

See also
 Basel Convention
 Rotterdam Convention
 Stockholm Convention

References

External links
 Text of the Convention
 List of Countries which have Signed, Ratified/Acceded 
 Basel Action Network
 Nigerian case entry at Trade and Environment Database

Waste treaties
Chemical safety
Treaties concluded in 1991
Treaties entered into force in 1998
African Union treaties
Hazardous waste
1991 in Mali
1998 in the environment
Treaties of Benin
Treaties of Burkina Faso
Treaties of Burundi
Treaties of Cameroon
Treaties of Ivory Coast
Treaties of the Comoros
Treaties of the Republic of the Congo
Treaties of Zaire
Treaties of Egypt
Treaties of the Transitional Government of Ethiopia
Treaties of Gabon
Treaties of the Gambia
Treaties of the Libyan Arab Jamahiriya
Treaties of Mali
Treaties of Mozambique
Treaties of Mauritius
Treaties of Niger
Treaties of Senegal
Treaties of the Republic of the Sudan (1985–2011)
Treaties of Tanzania
Treaties of Togo
Treaties of Tunisia
Treaties of Uganda
Treaties of Zimbabwe